Peril's Gate is volume six of the Wars of Light and Shadow by Janny Wurts. It is also volume three of the Alliance of Light, the third story arc in the Wars of Light and Shadow.

External links
Peril's Gate Webpage
Peril's Gate Excerpt

2001 American novels
American fantasy novels
Wars of Light and Shadow
Alliance of Light
HarperCollins books